Twentynine Palms (also known as 29 Palms) is a city in San Bernardino County, California. Twentynine Palms serves as one of the entry points to Joshua Tree National Park.

History 

Twentynine Palms was named for the palm trees found there in 1852 by Col. Henry Washington while surveying the San Bernardino base line. A post office was established in 1927.

A road named Utah Trail honors the late 1800s pioneers on a trail originating in Utah (reportedly Saint George) that went to Twentynine Palms.
Nearby is a small Indian reservation belonging to the Twenty-Nine Palms Band of Mission Indians.

Joshua Tree National Park, which lies just to the south of Twentynine Palms, was designated a national monument in 1936, and became a national park in 1994. The nearby Marine Corps Air Ground Combat Center Twentynine Palms was founded in 1952.

Demographics

Its population as of July 1, 2013, was estimated at 25,768.

2010 census
At the 2010 census, there were 25,048 people in 8,095 households, including 5,847 families, in the city. There were 9,431 housing units at an average density of 159.5 per square mile, of the occupied units 2,742 (33.9%) were owner-occupied and 5,353 (66.1%) were rented. The homeowner vacancy rate was 3.6%; the rental vacancy rate was 9.2%.  6,876 people (27.5% of the population) lived in owner-occupied housing units and 14,825 people (59.2%) lived in rental housing units. The racial makeup of the city was 71.6%, White (60.8% non-Hispanic), 8.2% African American, 1.3%  Native American, 3.9%  Asian, 1.4%  Pacific Islander, 6.7%  from other races, and 6.9% from two or more races. Hispanic or Latino of any race were 20.8% of the population.

The census reported that 21,701 people (86.6% of the population) lived in households, and 3,347 (13.4%) lived in non-institutionalized group quarters.

Of the 8,095 households 43.3% had children under the age of 18 living in them, 54.5%  were opposite-sex married couples living together, 12.9% had a female householder with no husband present, 4.9% had a male householder with no wife present. There were 5.0% unmarried opposite-sex partnerships, and 1.6% same-sex married couples or partnerships. 21.1% of households were one person and 5.6% were one person aged 65 or older. The average household size was 2.68 and the average family size was 3.10.

The age distribution was 25.6%  under the age of 18, 30.0%  aged 18 to 24, 25.5% aged 25 to 44, 13.1% aged 45 to 64, and 5.8%  who were 65 or older. The median age was 23.5 years. For every 100 females, there were 129.0 males. For every 100 females age 18 and over, there were 139.9 males.

The median household income was $42,572.  About 14.4% of the population were living below the poverty line.

2000 census
At the 2000 census there were 14,764 people in 5,653 households, including 3,855 families, in the city. The population density was 269.3 inhabitants per square mile (104.0/km). The racial makeup of the city was 71.0% White, 9.4% African American, 1.5% Native American, 3.8% Asian, 10.2% Pacific Islander, 6.2% from other races, and 6.4% from two or more races. Hispanic or Latino of any race were 14.9%.

Of the 5,653 households 39.1% had children under the age of 18 living with them, 49.8% were married couples living together, 13.7% had a female householder with no husband present, and 31.8% were non-families. 25.1% of households were one person and 7.4% were one person aged 65 or older. The average household size was 2.6 and the average family size was 3.1.

The age distribution was 31.2% under the age of 18, 15.2% from 18 to 24, 28.4% from 25 to 44, 16.7% from 45 to 64, and 8.6% 65 or older. The median age was 27 years. For every 100 females, there were 101.8 males. For every 100 females age 18 and over, there were 98.7 males.

The median household income was $31,178 and the median family income was $32,251. Males had a median income of $25,081 versus $25,141 for females. The per capita income for the city was $14,613. About 13.6% of families and 16.8% of the population were below the poverty line, including 25.3% of those under age 18 and 10.0% of those age 65 or over.

Geography
The city is located in the Mojave Desert in Southern California. It lies on the northern side of the Joshua Tree National Park and includes one of the entrances to the park, at the Oasis of Mara.

The Marine Corps Air Ground Combat Center Twentynine Palms is located there.

Climate
On average, temperatures reach  on 89 days,  on 154 days, and the freezing mark on 17 nights annually. Winters are moderately cool, with highs in the 60s °F and lows in the 40s °F. Summers are hot, with high temperatures above . The wettest month is August, with  inches of rain, mostly from monsoon thunderstorms.

Government
The city uses a council-manager form of government. An elected city council establishes policy and appoints a city manager who executes these policies.

State and federal representation

Economy
The Oasis of Mara, the original source of water and the historic source of all economic activity in the area, is divided into two parts. To the east, a long strip of palm trees terminates at the Joshua Tree National Park Visitor's Center, which is visited by approximately 140,000 people every year, and is maintained by the United States National Park Service. To the west, the remainder of the oasis is owned by the 29 Palms Inn, a historic hotel, and ends in a large shaded pond.

The current economy depends largely on the nearby Marine Corps Air Ground Combat Center, as well as tourism associated with Joshua Tree National Park. In February 2015, the city set in place rules governing vacation rentals, and has granted approximately one hundred permits, compared to over one thousand in the nearby community of Joshua Tree.

Cultural attractions
The city has a series of 26 outdoor murals painted on local buildings featuring various aspects of desert life and history.

The 29 Palms Historical Society, housed in the original schoolhouse of the city, maintains a museum devoted to local history. The Historical Society also hosts an annual "Weed Show" each November devoted to art work composed of weeds. The Twentynine Palms Artists Guild maintains exhibits devoted to local artists.

Education
 Copper Mountain College is a community college serving the Morongo Basin.
 The Morongo Unified School District provides an education for public school students.
 Mayfield College offers a training program to prepare active duty service members for careers in the Heating, Ventilation, Air Conditioning, and Refrigeration (HVAC/R) industry.

Media

The Desert Trail newspaper in Yucca Valley is published weekly. The Sun Runner Magazine of California Desert Life and Culture is published bi-monthly.

There are two TV stations: K15FC-D (KESQ-TV (ABC), KPSP (CBS), KDFX (Fox), KCWQ-LD (CW) and KUNA-LD (Telemundo) subchannels) and KPSE-LD (My Network) 29 (also KMIR-TV (NBC), ION, MeTV and Movies! subchannels) from the Riverside County, California TV market, but the area is actually part of the Palm Springs TV market.

KEXV and KPLM are low power TV stations for the town and Yucca Valley.

KVMD is licensed in Twentynine Palms and serves all of Los Angeles and the Inland Empire.

There is one AM station: KNWH a transmitter of KNWQ-1140 "KNews" Radio – Twentynine Palms (Inland Empire, California and Coachella Valley radio markets) CA US news/talk, and seven commercial plus two public FM Stations –

Low power FM Translators:
 K214CR|r.KCRW-89.9 NPR – Twentynine Palms (San Bernardino) CA US Public Radio.
 92.1 KHCS (91.7 Palm Desert) Christian Radio.
 92.7 KKUU (Indio) Urban/Top 40.
 95.5 KCLZ (KCLB Coachella) Rock music and Las Vegas Raiders football
 96.3 KKCM (KXCM – Palm Springs) Country music.
 103.3 KDHI (KRCK Mecca) Hot AC.
 103.7 (KNWZ-FM 94.3 Desert Hot Springs) News radio.
 106.3 KPLM (Thousand Palms) Country music.
Local stations:
 101.5 KHWY (Amboy) Classic rock. (High Desert (California) radio market).
 102.7 KMRB-FM (Joshua Tree) Variety.
 107.7 KCDZ (Yucca Valley) Local radio.

Transportation
  State Route 62 runs east–west through the town.
 Bus service is provided by the Morongo Basin Transit Authority (MBTA).
 Closest passenger airport is Palm Springs Airport (IATA: PSP).

Notable people
 Willie Boy, subject of the novel Willie Boy: A Desert Manhunt, and the film Tell Them Willie Boy Is Here. He was a Piute-Chemehuevi Native American born in 29 Palms.
 Doug Cockle, actor and director
 Conrad Dobler, NFL lineman, attended and played football at Twentynine Palms high school.
 Dick Dale, Legendary "King of the Surf Guitar", lived on a ranch in 29 Palms until he died in March 2019.
 Mike Evans, actor and writer, was a longtime resident and died at his mother's house in Twentynine Palms.
 Huell Howser, television personality, actor, producer, writer, singer, and voice artist, best known as host of PBS' California's Gold.
 Carrie Ann Lucas, lawyer, disability rights advocate, and activist
 Bryan D. O'Connor, retired United States Marine Corps Colonel and former NASA astronaut
 Cliff Raven, noted American tattoo pioneer, lived and worked in Twentynine Palms in his later years.
 Elizabeth Warder Crozer Campbell, logged thousands of archeological finds in the 1920s in Joshua Tree Park. Wrote The Desert Was Home.
 Paramhansa Yogananda, Indian yoga master and teacher who lived in America from 1920 to 1952, had a desert retreat in Twentynine Palms.
 Brant Bjork, musician, owns a house and studio in Twentynine Palms.

In popular culture

Music
 A song, "The Lady from 29 Palms", was written by Allie Wrubel in 1947 and recorded by such artists as Frank Sinatra, Freddy Martin, Tony Pastor, and The Andrews Sisters.
 The rock group U2 stayed at Harmony Hotel in the 1980s when working on their famous The Joshua Tree album.
 The album Lily on the Beach by German electronic music ensemble Tangerine Dream contains an instrumental piano ballad called "Twenty-Nine Palms".
 Former Led Zeppelin singer Robert Plant had a hit single called "29 Palms", from his solo album Fate of Nations in 1993.
 The band Sublime mentioned Twentynine Palms in their song "Thanx" on their 40oz. to Freedom album. Twentynine Palms is also a city listed in "April 29, 1992 (Miami)" on their self-titled album Sublime.
 Track two of the album Places by Brad Mehldau, released in 2000, is named after the city.
 In 2006, the pop punk band Forever Came Calling was founded here.
 Nashville country band Granville Automatic has a song named after the town, inspired by the book by Deanne Stillman
 Jonathan Richman and the Modern Lovers mentions the town in the song "California Desert Party" featured on the album Modern Lovers '88.

Film
 Some scenes in the 1963 comedy film It's a Mad, Mad, Mad, Mad World were shot in Twentynine Palms.
 Some scenes in the 1964 comedy film Kiss Me, Stupid were shot in Twentynine Palms.
 Twentynine Palms is a 2003 drama/horror film set in Twentynine Palms.
 Actor Jared Leto launched a skin care line called "Twentynine Palms," inspired by the town.

Radio
On April 22, 1945, The Jack Benny Program was broadcast from Twentynine Palms Auxiliary Naval Air Station. There were jokes about the base's dry, hot weather, along with a comedic sketch of the town's history.

References

Further reading

External links

 

 
Cities in the Mojave Desert
Cities in San Bernardino County, California
Populated places established in 1987
1987 establishments in California
Incorporated cities and towns in California